Christian Magnus Falsen (14 September 1782 – 13 January 1830) was a Norwegian constitutional father, statesman, jurist, and historian. He was an important member of the  Norwegian Constituent Assembly  and was one of the writers of the Constitution of Norway.

Biography
Christian Magnus Falsen was born in Christiania, now Oslo, Norway. He was the son of Enevold de Falsen (1755–1808), a dramatist and author of a  war song Til vaaben. In 1802, he graduated with a degree in law at the University of Copenhagen. In 1807, Christian Magnus Falsen was appointed a barrister. In 1808 he became circuit judge at Follo and lived in Ås, Akershus   Akershus, Norway.

After Denmark ceded Norway to Sweden in 1814 he played an important part in politics.  Falsen led the Independent Party (Selvstendighetspartiet) that wanted complete independence and was prepared to resist Sweden militarily. He upheld King Christian Frederick and, after the separation of Norway from Denmark, assisted in drafting a constitution for Norway. During the drafting of the Norwegian constitution, Falsen was one of the principle authors of the Jew clause, which prohibited Jews from entering Norway.,  This document was modeled upon that adopted by France in 1791 and which was approved on 17 May 1814 by the Norwegian Constituent Assembly (Riksforsamlingenat)  at Eidsvoll. He was also strongly inspired by Thomas Jefferson and the Constitution of the United States of America. He is often called Father of the Norwegian Constitution — Grunnlovens far.

Falsen held a seat in the Storting and generally favored conservative political positions.  In 1822 he was appointed Attorney General of the Kingdom, a post which he held for three years.  In 1825 he became bailiff for Bergen, and in 1827 president of the Supreme Court. In 1828 he suffered from a stroke and did not return to the office. Christian Magnus Falsen is buried at Gamlebyen Churchyard. Next to his gravestone is the gravestone of his second wife.

In 1804 he married Anna Birgitte Munch (1787-1810), with whom he had the son Enevold Munch Falsen (1810–80). In 1811, after her death, he married Elisabeth Severine Böckmann (1782-1848). She was the widow of Brede Stoltenberg, a brother of the tradesman Gregers Stoltenberg. With her he had the children Henrik Anton Falsen (1813–66) and Elisabeth Christine Falsen (1820–76).

Note

References

Other sources
 Daa, Ludvig Kristensen  (1860)  Magnus Falsen, et Bidrag til Norges Konstitutions Historie (Christiana) 
Vullum, Erik  (1881) Kristian Magnus Falsen, Grundlovens Fader   (Christiana)   
Indrebø, Gustav  (1919) Det norske generalprokurørembættet: Chr. M. Falsen 1822-1825  (Christiana)  
Østvedt, Einar (1945) Christian Magnus Falsen: linjen i hans politikk. (Oslo: H. Aschehoug and co)

Related Reading
Barton, H. Arnold  (2002)  Sweden and Visions of Norway: Politics and Culture 1814-1905   (Southern Illinois University Press) 

19th-century Norwegian historians
1782 births
1830 deaths
Fathers of the Constitution of Norway
Chief justices of Norway
Presidents of the Storting
Members of the Storting
19th-century Norwegian judges
University of Copenhagen alumni
People from Ås, Akershus